Seyyed Mohammad Hojjat Kooh Kamari was a contemporary Iranian Muslim Faqīh and a Twelver Marja' who was in charge of the administration of the Qom Seminary for ten years. He was born on 17 March 1893 and died on 19 January 1953. He was a prominent student of Abdul-Karim Haeri Yazdi and after him held the position of Shia authority.

Birth and lineage
Seyyed Mohammad Hojjat Kooh Kamari was born on 17 March 1893 in Tabriz, Iran. His family was a religious family and his father, Seyyed Ali Kooh Kamari Tabrizi, was one of the mujtahids of Tabriz. His lineage is from Sayyids of Kooh Kamar in Zonuzaq Rural District, Marand County, East Azerbaijan Province, Iran and goes back to Ali ibn Husayn Zayn al-Abidin.

Scientific life
Seyyed Mohammad Hojjat Kooh Kamari studied literature, mathematics, ancient medicine and some new sciences in Tabriz, Iran. He learned most of the basic courses of Islamic jurisprudence and principles from his father there and also taught for some time. In 1912, he went to Najaf, Iraq to continue his education after taking basic seminary courses from his father. 

In Najaf, he learned Islamic jurisprudence, Principles of Islamic jurisprudence, Hadith studies and Biographical evaluation from the masters of Najaf seminary, including Mohammed Kazem Yazdi, Fethullah Qa'ravi Isfahani and Agha Zia ol Din Araghi. He also studied astronomy there. Hojjat fell ill during his studies in Najaf and returned to Tabriz on the advice of his father, but after a while he went to Najaf again and in addition to continuing his education, he also taught.

In 1930, he returned to Iran and settled in Qom and began teaching in the Qom Seminary. His eloquence and mastery in teaching and his surroundings on the opinions and sources of Islamic jurisprudence attracted many students to his study circle. In 1945, he started the foundation of Hojjatieh school in Qom.

Shia authority
After the deaths of Abu l-Hasan al-Isfahani in 1947 and Seyyed Hossein Tabatabaei Qomi in 1948, he became a Shia authority; And millions followed him in religious rulings.

He had authority of Hadith studies from some of his masters, including his father, Agha Zia ol Din Araghi, Shariat Isfahani, Seyyed Abutorab Khansari, Abdullah Mamaqani, Seyyed Hassan Sadr, Mohammad Baqer Birjandi, Abdul-Karim Haeri Yazdi and Mohammad Hossein Kashif al-Ghatta. He also received a certificate of Ijtihad from Muhammad Hossein Naini, Agha Zia ol Din Araghi and some of his other teachers.

His books
Seyyed Mohammad Hojjat Kooh Kamari has many writings in Hadith studies, Fiqh, Principles of Islamic jurisprudence and Biographical evaluation.

Hadith studies
His most important hadith works are:
 Lavame ol-Anvar al-Qaraviah fi Morsalat el-Asar el-Nabavieh
 Mostadrak ol-Mostadrak fi Estedrake ma Fata An Sahebe el-Mostadrak
 Jame ol-Ahadith va al-Osool

Fiqh
His important jurisprudential works are:
 Ketab al-Beie
 Ketab ol-Salat
 Ketab al-Vaqf
 Tanqih ol-Mataleb ol-Mobhamah fi Amal el-Sovar el-Mojassamah
 Manaseke Haj
 Kholasat ol-Ahkam
 Montakhab ol-Ahkam
 Tarjomeye Farsi Bedayat ol-Hedayah (Persian translation of )

He also published notes on some Fatwa books, including:
 Vasilat ol-Nejah by Abu l-Hasan al-Isfahani
 Al-Urwah al-Wuthqa by Mohammed Kazem Yazdi

Principles of Islamic jurisprudence
He has written the following books on the principles of Islamic jurisprudence:
 Resalat al-Estes'hab
 Notes on Kefayah al-osul by Muhammad Kadhim Khorasani

Biographical evaluation
The Biographical evaluation book of him is:
 Notes on Tanqih ol-Maqal by Abdullah Mamaqani

According to Shahab ud-Din Mar'ashi Najafi, some of Seyyed Mohammad Hojjat Kooh Kamari's writings, were in his library in his own handwriting and have not been published.

His students
Due to his years of education in the Hawza Najaf and the Qom Seminary, he was able to raise many outstanding students. Some of them are:

 Seyyed Mohammad Taqi Ghazanfari
 Seyyed Mohammad Mohaqeq Damad
 Mirza Hashem Amoli
 Mohammad Ali Qazi Tabatabaei
 Mousa Shubairi Zanjani
 Morteza Haeri Yazdi
 Ali Safi Golpaygani
 Lotfollah Safi Golpaygani
 Mirza Ali Qoravi Alyari
 Ja'far Sobhani
 Hossein Wahid Khorasani
 Abdul Karim Haghshenas
 Muhammad Husayn Tabatabai
 Mehdi Haeri Yazdi
 Ali Meshkini
 Moslem Malakouti
 Ali al-Sistani
 Mohammad Sadoughi
 Karamatollah Malek-Hosseini

Death
Seyyed Mohammad Hojjat Kooh Kamari, after a period of serious illness, died on 19 January 1953 at the age of 62 in Qom and was buried in a room next to the mosque of the Hojjatieh School.

Commemoration
The commemoration of Seyyed Mohammad Hojjat Kooh Kamari was held in February 2018 by the Qom Seminary.

See also
 Seyyed Hassan Eslami Ardakani
 Ali Movahedi-Kermani
 Najm al-Din Tabasi
 Mohammad Bagher Estahbanati
 Zakaria ibn Idris Ash'ari Qomi
 Ahmad ibn Ishaq Ash'ari Qomi
 Zakaria ibn Adam Ash'ari Qomi
 Mohammad ibn Umar Kashshi
 Mirza-ye Qomi
 Agha Hossein Khansari
 Mirza Jawad Agha Maleki Tabrizi

References

External links
 Hojjat Kooh Kamari on Encyclopedia of the Islamic World
 Hojjat Kooh Kamari on wikinoor

1893 births
1953 deaths
People from Tabriz
Iranian Shia clerics
Shia scholars of Islam